Acquanegra may refer to two Italian towns in Lombardy:

 Acquanegra Cremonese, in the province of Cremona
 Acquanegra sul Chiese, in the province of Mantua